Monika Cvernová(born 30 July 1990) is a Czech football midfielder. She plays for 1.FC Slovácko in the Czech First Division.

She is a member of the Czech national team. Cvernová made her debut for the national team in a match against Slovakia on 20 March 2009.

References

1990 births
Living people
Czech women's footballers
Czech Republic women's international footballers
1. FC Slovácko (women) players
Women's association football midfielders
Czech Women's First League players